The Orange County Courthouse, located in Orlando, Florida, United States, comprises the Ninth Judicial Circuit Court of Florida and its associated offices, including Orange County's county court. The courthouse complex includes a 23-level courthouse tower, two five-story office buildings for the State Attorney and Public Defender, and a 1,500 car parking facility." It is connected to other downtown points by the free Lymmo bus.

References

External links
Ninth Judicial Circuit Court of Florida

County courthouses in Florida
Skyscraper office buildings in Orlando, Florida
Government buildings completed in 1997
Buildings and structures in Orlando, Florida
Postmodern architecture in Florida
1997 establishments in Florida